The Battle of Izúcar or the Battle of Izúcar de Matamoros was a battle of the War of Mexican Independence that occurred on 23 February 1812 in the area around Izúcar de Matamoros, Puebla. The battle was fought between the royalist forces loyal to the Spanish crown and the Mexican rebels fighting for independence from the Spanish Empire.

The Mexican insurgents, who were commended by General Mariano Matamoros y Guridi managed to force the Spanish loyalist forces, commanded by the Brigadier General, Ciriaco del Llano to retreat. It was during this battle that a young Vicente Guerrero, later the president of Mexico, first distinguished himself in battle.

See also 
 Mexican War of Independence
 Mariano Matamoros y Guridi

References

Bibliography 
 

Izucar
Conflicts in 1812
History of Puebla
Izucar
Izucar
1812 in New Spain
February 1812 events